Oral Thompson (born 11 December 1982) is a Jamaican sprinter.

References

1982 births
Living people
Jamaican male sprinters
Athletes (track and field) at the 2010 Commonwealth Games
Central American and Caribbean Games gold medalists for Jamaica
Competitors at the 2010 Central American and Caribbean Games
Central American and Caribbean Games medalists in athletics
Commonwealth Games competitors for Jamaica